SH3 domain-binding protein 1 is a protein that in humans is encoded by the SH3BP1 gene.

References

Further reading